Athens Airport, also known as Athens International Airport on signage, is a railway station and metro station that serves the international airport of Athens, Greece. It operates on both the Athens Suburban Railway as well as Line 3 of the Athens Metro. It is the first and only train station in Greece that is not managed by GaiOSE (a subsidiary of the national rail company OSE). It is owned by the airport, which charges the train operating companies (Hellenic Train and STASY) fees to use it.

History
The station opened on 30 July 2004, two weeks before the Athens Olympics. Although it was projected that only commuter rail would use the station, the Athens Metro operating company decided to extend Line 3 to the airport. However, building new tracks was not economically viable, so the route would be served by dual-voltage second-generation trains and would share tracks with Suburban Railway trains between Doukissis Plakentias station and the airport. Because of the limited availability of these trains (7 in total), only 1 or 2 per hour reach the station, leaving the airport every 36 minutes from 06:10 to 23:34.

The decision to extend Line 3 to the airport forced a change to the station design; Metro trains have a higher floor than Suburban Railway trains, so the central track had to be lowered. This is why initial services to the airport did not use any stations between Doukissis Plakentias and the airport. The intermediate stations did not have the tracks lowered; parts of the platforms were raised in 2006. Since then, all intermediate stations have been used by both services.

Platforms
Athens Airport Station has two island platforms and three tracks. Track 1 is not used due to low traffic, Track 2 is used by the Metro, and Track 3 is used by the Suburban Railway. All trains terminate at this station.

Access
The railway station is immediately adjacent to the airport terminal, accessible by an elevated walkway. Because of the additional cost of using the station, there is a surcharge for passengers entering or exiting the airport. As of 2020, the base fare to the airport is €9, with varying prices for round trips or groups.

Services

Since 27 September 2022, the following weekday services call at this station:

Future developments
As the airport's passenger numbers are rising, services may get denser and Track 1 could be used again. Moreover, for many years there have been plans to extend Suburban Railway services to Rafina, a suburb of Athens and the third largest harbour of the city as well. Although original plans show the line branching off the main one after Pallini or Doukissis Plakentias Station, then running in a reserved-for-this-purpose median of the A64 Mount Hymmetus Ring Road and then extending to Rafina, recent plans have called for an extension of the line from the Airport. Such an extension would be shorter and less expensive to build, however, it has been unpopular due to the fact that the travelling time from and to Rafina will be longer and certain areas will not be served.

Gallery

See also
Railway stations in Greece
Hellenic Railways Organization
Hellenic Train
Proastiakos

References

Airport railway stations
Athens Metro stations
East Attica
Railway stations in Attica
Railway stations in highway medians
Railway stations opened in 2004
2004 establishments in Greece